April Ashley  (29 April 1935 – 27 December 2021) was an English model. She was outed as a transgender woman by The Sunday People newspaper in 1961 and is one of the earliest British people known to have had sex reassignment surgery. Her marriage was annulled in the court case of Corbett v Corbett.

Early life
Born at 126 Smithdown Road (then Sefton General Hospital) in Liverpool, Ashley was one of six surviving children of a Roman Catholic father, Frederick Jamieson, and Protestant mother, Ada Brown, who had married two years before.  During her childhood in Liverpool, Ashley suffered from both calcium deficiency, requiring weekly calcium injections at the Alder Hey Children's Hospital, and bed-wetting, resulting in her being given her own box room, at the age of two, when the family moved house.

1950s to 1970s
Ashley joined the merchant navy in 1951 at the age of 16. Following a suicide attempt, she was given dishonourable discharge, and a second attempt resulted in her being sent to Ormskirk District General Hospital psychiatric unit at age 17.

In her book The First Lady, Ashley tells the story of the rape she endured before transitioning. A roommate raped her, and she was severely injured.

Gender transition
After leaving the hospital, Ashley moved to London, at one point claiming to have shared a boarding house with then ship's steward John Prescott, later deputy prime minister of the United Kingdom. Having started cross-dressing, she moved to Paris in the late 1950s, began using the name Toni April, and joined the entertainer Coccinelle in the cast of the drag cabaret at the Caroussel Theatre.

At the age of 25, having saved £3,000, Ashley had a seven-hour-long sex reassignment surgery on 12 May 1960, performed in Casablanca, Morocco, by Georges Burou. All her hair fell out, and she endured significant pain, but the operation was successful.

Modelling career and public outing
After returning to Britain, she began using the name April Ashley and became a successful fashion model, appearing in British Vogue, for which she was photographed by David Bailey, and winning a small role in the 1962 film The Road to Hong Kong, which starred Bing Crosby and Bob Hope.

A friend sold her story to the media in 1961 and The Sunday People outed Ashley as a trans woman. She became a centre of attention and some scandal and her film credit was dropped.

In November 1960 Ashley met Hon. Arthur Corbett (later 3rd Baron Rowallan), the Eton-educated son and heir of Lord Rowallan. They married in 1963 but the marriage soon ended. Ashley's lawyers wrote to Corbett in 1966 demanding maintenance payments and in 1967 Corbett responded by filing suit to have the marriage annulled. The annulment was granted in 1970 on the grounds that Ashley was male, but Corbett had known about her history when they married. This is the case known as Corbett v Corbett.

Later life and death
After a heart attack in London, Ashley retired for some years to the Welsh border town of Hay-on-Wye. In her book April Ashley's Odyssey she stated that Amanda Lear was assigned male at birth and that they had worked together at Le Carousel where Lear had used the drag name Peki d'Oslo. Ashley had once been great friends with Lear but according to Ashley's book The First Lady they had had a major falling out and had not spoken for years.

In the 1980s Ashley married Jeffrey West on the cruise ship RMS Queen Mary in Long Beach, California, US. They parted but remained friends. In the early 1990s, she worked for Greenpeace before taking a job in an art gallery.

She talked about her life at St George's Hall, Liverpool as part of the city's Homotopia Festival on 15 November 2008, and on 18 February 2009 at the Southbank Centre.

Ashley latterly lived in Fulham, southwest London. She died at home on 27 December 2021, at the age of 86.

Biographies
April Ashley's Odyssey, a biography by Duncan Fallowell, was published in 1982. In 2006 Ashley released her autobiography, The First Lady, and made TV appearances on Channel Five News, This Morning and BBC News. In one interview she said, "This is the real story and contains a lot of things I just couldn't say in 1982", including alleged affairs with Michael Hutchence, Peter O'Toole, Omar Sharif, Turner Prize sculptor Grayson Perry and others. The book was pulled from the market, however, after it was discovered that it heavily plagiarized the 1982 book written by Fallowell.

The 1983 biography of Peter O'Toole by Michael Freedland rejects the claim of an affair with Ashley. It states that he was acquainted with her in Spain while filming, but his then-wife Siân Phillips was with him at the time and knew the relationship to be platonic.

In 2012 Pacific Films and Limey Yank Productions announced a project to create a film about Ashley's life.

Awards and honours
 Ashley was appointed Member of the Order of the British Empire (MBE) in the 2012 Birthday Honours for services to transgender equality.
 The exhibition ‘April Ashley: portrait of a lady’ was held at the Museum of Liverpool from 27 September 2013 to 1 March 2015.
 Ashley was awarded a Lifetime Achievement honour at the European Diversity Awards 2014.
 In December 2016, Ashley was awarded an Honorary Doctorate from the University of Liverpool.

References

External links

 April Ashley Photo Gallery Tribute
 April Ashley Collection (Digital Transgender Archive)
 "April Ashley, model, actor and transgender activist, dies aged 86" at The Guardian
 "April Ashley obituary" at The Times

1935 births
2021 deaths
20th-century English LGBT people
21st-century English LGBT people
21st-century English memoirists
21st-century English women writers
British Merchant Navy personnel
British women memoirists
English drag queens
English female models
Transgender memoirists
Members of the Order of the British Empire
People from Liverpool
Transgender entertainers
Transgender female models
Transgender case law in the United Kingdom
People involved in plagiarism controversies